Edaphobaculum is a Gram-negative, strictly aerobic, rod-shaped and non-motile genus of bacteria from the family of Chitinophagaceae with one known species (Edaphobaculum flavum). Edaphobaculum flavum has been isolated from grassland soil from Erdos in China.

References

Chitinophagia
Bacteria genera
Monotypic bacteria genera
Taxa described in 2017